The following is a list of prime ministers of the Comoros since 1957, to the abolition of the post of Prime Minister in 2002.

List

(Dates in italics indicate de facto continuation of office)

Affiliations
PV - Green Party
PB - White Party
RDPC - Democratic Assembly of the Comoran People (renamed White Party)
UDC - Comoros Democratic Union (renamed Green Party)
UCP - Comorian Union for Progress
RND - National Rally for Development
UDD - Union of Democrats for Democracy
RDR - Rally for Democracy and Renewal
FNR - Forum of National Recovery
PRC - Republican Party of the Comoros
n-p - Nonpartisan

See also
Comoros
List of sultans on the Comoros
List of colonial governors of the Comoros
List of heads of state of the Comoros
Lists of office-holders

External links
World Statesmen – Comoros

Heads of government
Heads of government
Comoros
Comoros
 Heads of government
Comoros
Heads of government